is the second live album by Japanese electronica/rock duo Boom Boom Satellites. Released on November 6, 2013, the album and video pack consists of a recording of the last stop of their partially cancelled tour to promote their most recent album Embrace.

Background
In late 2012, Boom Boom Satellites prepared to begin a tour to promote their 15th anniversary together as well as their album Embrace. However, in December of that year the band revealed that vocalist and guitarist Michiyuki Kawashima had the early stages of a brain tumor and had to prepare for surgery. Bassist and programmer Masayuki Nakano revealed that his bandmate had a history of brain tumors, with their writing and recording sessions often interrupted by Kawashima's health issues, but this was the first time that they ever had to cancel concerts. They ultimately decided to play the last few shows of 2012 and cancel much of their planned national tour in 2013, although they left the possibility of several shows in April and May 2013 as possible. Their concert on May 3, 2013, was planned to be their first ever solo concert at the famous Nippon Budokan. In February 2013, Nakano revealed Kawashima had been released from the hospital and they were writing songs, again. In a later statement, the band revealed that they were cancelling all but their Budokan concert.

The concert was streamed live online via Ustream with 360-degree viewing angles; this was later expanded to YouTube as part of YouTube Japan's Music Week as well as on Nico Nico Douga's live feature. Following the concert, their performance of "Nine" was available on their website with the 360 degree view. The concert was later shown on Fuji TV Next on June 21, 2013.

On August 28, 2013, the band announced that they would be releasing the concert on an album due November 6, 2013, with a DVD or Blu-ray containing the live performances as well. The CD features 10 of the live performances, while the DVD or Blu-ray released with it features the concert's full 16 song set list. The Blu-ray edition also comes with a 128-page booklet detailing the concert. The digital edition of the album, called the "Complete Edition", released to the iTunes Store, Amazon MP3, and mora, features audio versions of the full concert.

Track listing

References

2013 live albums
Boom Boom Satellites albums
Albums recorded at the Nippon Budokan